Gisela Lladó Cánovas (born 1 January 1979), known mononymously as Gisela, is a Spanish pop singer and voice actress. She was born in El Bruc (Barcelona), in Catalonia, Spain and studied journalism at the Autonomous University of Barcelona before becoming famous after placing eighth in the first Spanish edition of Operación Triunfo in 2001. She is also known for representing Andorra in the Eurovision Song Contest 2008 in Belgrade, Serbia.

Career after Operación Triunfo
Her first album, Parte De Mí, came out in Spain in 2002, selling 260,000 copies in a few weeks. That year she also performed at the Eurovision Song Contest 2002 in Tallinn as a backing singer for her friend Rosa López. In 2003, she won the award for best voice in the Viña del Mar International Song Festival and she won the competition with the song Este Amor Es Tuyo.

Her second album in 2003, Más Allá has five singles, including Más Allá (and Catalan version: Més enllà), the No.1 Sola and Amor Divino. Also in 2003, her version of Irene Cara's "What a Feeling" was included in a commercial in the United Kingdom.

Her father, Salvador Lladó Piquer (1940–2019) died of cancer in Barcelona. Her manager is her older brother, Joan.

In 2020, Gisela performed live at The Academy Awards in Los Ángeles, performing the Castilian Spanish part of the song Into The Unknown from Frozen II.

Ni te lo imaginas
Her third album, Ni te lo imaginas, came out in 2006, under a new record label (Filmax, rather than Vale Music). There were four singles off the album, the first and the third becoming Gisela's most successful so far in her career. The first was Turu-Turu, a pop ballad reaching No.1 in Spain on its second week. Filmax released a Special Edition version of the album, including two new songs, the first called Mi mundo eres tú and the second, Viviré en tus sueños.

Eurovision 2008

Gisela was confirmed as the Andorran representative to perform in the Eurovision Song Contest 2008 with the song "Casanova". She competed in the first semi-final on 20 May 2008. She failed to get through to the final, placing 16th of 19 entries with 22 points. Although this result, she still managed success on the music charts reaching No.2 in Spain.

Filmography
Gisela has performed regional voice roles for the Disney movies Peter Pan 2 (2002), Beauty and the Beast (2003), the singing voice of Erika in Barbie as the Princess and the Pauper (2004), the singing voice of Giselle in Enchanted (2007) in both Castilian Spanish and Catalan, the singing voice of Elsa in Frozen (2013) and in Frozen II also in Castilian Spanish and Catalan. She was also in The Hairy Tooth Fairy (2006) and its sequel (2008), Snowflake, the White Gorilla (2011) and Serie B (2012), in Castilian Spanish.

On 9 February 2020, Gisela was called to join Idina Menzel, Aurora and eight more of Elsa's international dubbers to perform the song “Into the Unknown” during the 92nd Academy Awards. Every international performer sang one line of the song in a different language: Maria Lucia Heiberg Rosenberg in Danish, Willemijn Verkaik in German, Takako Matsu in Japanese, Carmen Sarahí in Latin American Spanish, Lisa Stokke in Norwegian, Kasia Łaska in Polish, Anna Buturlina in Russian, Gisela in European Spanish and Gam Wichayanee in Thai.

Musical Theatre

 2002–2003 – Peter Pan, el musical
 2004–2006 – El diluvio que viene
 2007–2008 – Boscos Endins
 2008–2009 – Aloma
 2009–2010 – Grease
 2010–2011 – 40 Principales: El musical
 2011–2013 – Érase una vez el musical / Un mundo mágico / El reino encantado
 2012–2013 – Esta noche no estoy para nadie
 2013–present – Gisela y el libro mágico
 2017 – La Bella Helena
 2017 – Nit de musicals

Discography

Albums

Singles

References

External links

 
 

1979 births
Living people
Star Academy participants
Eurovision Song Contest entrants for Andorra
Eurovision Song Contest entrants of 2008
Singers from Barcelona
21st-century Spanish singers
21st-century Spanish women singers